Broe is a surname. Notable people with the surname include:

 Camilla Broe, Danish citizen extradited to the US
 Carolyn Waters Broe, American conductor, composer and writer
 Carsten Broe (born 1963), Danish football team manager
 Ellen Broe (1900-1994), Danish nurse
 Georg Broe (1923–1998), Danish surrealist artist
 Irene Broe (1923–1992), Irish sculptor
 Tim Broe (born 1977), American long-distance runner

See also
Broe Township, Benson County, North Dakota